State Road 122 (SR 122), mostly known as Golfair Boulevard, is a  east-west state highway located entirely within Jacksonville, Duval County, Florida. It is almost entirely within the Brentwood neighborhood.

Route description 
SR 122 begins at exit 355 on Interstate 95 (I-95). From there, it runs east for a short length before intersecting with SR 117. After that, it turns southeastwardly towards the intersection with North Pearl Avenue where it becomes West 27th Street and continues along that street until its terminus at US Highway 17 (US 17). East 27th Street continues for several blocks as a local city street.

Major intersections

References

122
122
122